Enock Kwateng (born 9 April 1997) is a French professional footballer who last played as a right-back for  club Bordeaux. He is France youth international, having represented the country from U16 to U20 levels.

Club career

Nantes
Kwateng is a youth prospect of Nantes and eventually made his Ligue 1 first-team debut on 15 August 2015 against Angers in a 0–0 draw replacing Olivier Veigneau after 79 minutes.

Bordeaux
In June 2019, Kwateng agreed a four-year deal with league rivals Bordeaux. Due to the expiration of his Nantes contract he joined Bordeaux on a free transfer for the 2019–20 season.

International career
Of Ghanaian descent, Kwateng has represented France at U16, U17, U18, U19, and U20 levels

Honours
France U19
UEFA European Under-19 Championship: 2016

References

External links
 
 

Living people
1997 births
People from Mantes-la-Jolie
Footballers from Yvelines
French footballers
Association football fullbacks
France youth international footballers
French sportspeople of Ghanaian descent
FC Nantes players
FC Girondins de Bordeaux players
Ligue 1 players